Palmeras means palm trees in Spanish. It may also refer to:

 Palm Trees in the Snow, a 2015 Spanish romantic drama film
 Palmeras, the Spanish name for palmiers
 Palmeras, a song recorded by Spanish singer India Martínez
 Palmeras en la nieve (song), a song recorded by Spanish singer Pablo Alborán